Olearia grandiflora, commonly known as Mount Lofty daisy-bush, is a species of flowering plant in the family Asteraceae and is endemic to a restricted area of South Australia. It is a spreading shrub with egg-shaped leaves and white and yellow, daisy-like inflorescences.

Description
The leaves are glabrous and shiny on the upper surface, covered with white or rust-coloured, woolly hairs on the lower side.

Taxonomy
Olearia grandiflora was first formally described in 1852 by William Jackson Hooker in his book Icones Plantarum, from material collected by Charles Christian Dutton. The specific epithet (grandiflora) means "large-flowered".

Distribution and habitat
Olearia grandiflora grows in forest and woodland in the Mount Lofty Ranges region of South Australia.

References

grandiflora
Flora of South Australia
Plants described in 1852
Taxa named by William Jackson Hooker